Nadir is a settlement on the island of St. Thomas in the United States Virgin Islands.

The "Bridge to Nowhere" is located in Nadir.

References

Kidder, L.M. (ed.) (1999) Fodor's Caribbean 2000. New York: Fodor's Travel Publications.
Scott, C. R. (ed.) (2005) Insight guide: Caribbean (5th edition). London: Apa Publications.

Populated places in Saint Thomas, U.S. Virgin Islands
East End, Saint Thomas, U.S. Virgin Islands